In mathematics, a packing in a hypergraph is a partition of the set of the hypergraph's edges into a number of disjoint subsets such that no pair of edges in each subset share any vertex. There are two famous algorithms to achieve asymptotically optimal packing in k-uniform hypergraphs. One of them is a random greedy algorithm which was proposed by Joel Spencer. He used a branching process to formally prove the optimal achievable bound under some side conditions. The other algorithm is called the Rödl nibble and was proposed by Vojtěch Rödl et al. They showed that the achievable packing by the Rödl nibble is in some sense close to that of the random greedy algorithm.

History

The problem of finding the number of such subsets in a k-uniform hypergraph was originally motivated through a conjecture by Paul Erdős and Haim Hanani in 1963. Vojtěch Rödl proved their conjecture asymptotically under certain conditions in 1985. Pippenger and Joel Spencer generalized Rödl's results using a random greedy algorithm in 1989.

Definition and terminology

In the following definitions, the hypergraph is denoted by H=(V,E). H is called a k-uniform hypergraph if every edge in E consists of exactly k vertices.

 is a hypergraph packing if it is a subset of edges in H such that there is no pair of distinct edges with a common vertex.

 

Theorem

There exists an asymptotic packing P of size at least  for a -uniform hypergraph under the following two conditions,

For every pair of vertices shares only  common edges.

where  is the total number of vertices. This result was shown by Pippenger and was later proved by Joel Spencer. To address the asymptotic hypergraph packing problem, Joel Spencer proposed a random greedy algorithm. In this algorithm, a branching process is used as the basis and it was shown that it almost always achieves an asymptotically optimal packing under the above side conditions.

Asymptotic packing algorithms

There are two famous algorithms for asymptotic packing  of k-uniform hypergraphs: the random greedy algorithm via branching process, and the Rödl nibble.

Random greedy algorithm via branching process

Every edge  is independently and uniformly assigned a distinct real "birthtime" . The edges are taken one by one in the order of their birthtimes. The edge  is accepted and included in  if it does not overlap any previously accepted edges. Obviously, the subset  is a packing and it can be shown that its size is  almost surely. To show that, let stop the process of adding new edges at time . For an arbitrary , pick  such that for any -good hypergraph  where  denotes the probability of vertex  survival (a vertex survives if it is not in any edges in ) until time . In other words,  must include at least  vertices which means that . 

To complete the proof, it must be shown that . For that, the asymptotic behavior of  surviving is modeled by a continuous branching process. Every birth given by Eve consists of  offspring all with the same birth time say . The process is iterated for each offspring.

A rooted tree with the notions of parent, child, root, birthorder and wombmate shall be called a broodtree. Given a finite broodtree  we say for each vertex that it survives or dies. A childless vertex survives. A vertex dies if and only if it has at least one brood all of whom survive. Let  denote the probability that Eve survives in the broodtree  given by the above process. The objective is to show  and then for any fixed , it can be shown that . These two relations complete our argument.

To show , let . For  small,  as, roughly, an Eve starting at time  might have a birth in time interval  all of whose children survive while Eve has no births in  all of whose children survive. Letting  yields the differential equation . The initial value  gives a unique solution . Note that indeed .

To prove , consider a procedure we call History which either aborts or produces a broodtree. History contains a set  of vertices, initially .  will have a broodtree structure with  the root. The  are either processed or unprocessed,  is initially unprocessed. To each  is assigned a birthtime , we initialize . History is to take an unprocessed  and process it as follows. Now  is considered processed. History halts, if not aborted, when all  are processed. If History does not abort then root  survives broodtree  if and only if  survives at time . For a fixed broodtree, let  denote the probability that the branching process yields broodtree . By the finiteness of the branching process, the summation over all broodtrees  and History does not abort. The  distribution of its broodtree approaches the branching process distribution. Thus .

The Rödl nibble

In 1985, Rödl proved Paul Erdős’s conjecture by a method called the Rödl nibble. Rödl's result can be formulated in form of either packing or covering problem. Paul Erdős et al. conjecture was 

.

where . This conjecture roughly means that a tactical configuration is asymptotically achievable. One may similarly define the packing number  as the maximal size of a family  of k-element subsets of  having the property that every l-element set is contained in at most one .

Packing under the stronger condition
In 1997, Noga Alon, Jeong Han Kim, and Joel Spencer also supply a good bound for  under the stronger codegree condition that every distinct pair  has at most one edge in common. 

For a k-uniform, D-regular hypergraph on n vertices, if k > 3, there exists a packing P covering all vertices but at most . If k = 3 there exists a packing P covering all vertices but at most .

This bound is desirable in various applications, such as Steiner triple system.
A Steiner Triple System is a 3-uniform, simple hypergraph in which every pair of vertices is contained in precisely one edge. Since a Steiner Triple System is clearly d=(n-1)/2-regular, the above bound supplies the following asymptotic improvement.

Any Steiner Triple System on n vertices contains a packing covering all vertices but at most .

See also

 Branching process
 Independent set
 Graph coloring
 Covering number
 Set packing
 Ramsey's theorem
 Set cover problem
 Sphere packing
 Steiner system

References

 .
 .
 .
 .
 .
 .

Hypergraphs